MSK Břeclav is a Czech football club located in the town of Břeclav. It currently plays in the Czech Fourth Division.

References

External links
 Official website 

Football clubs in the Czech Republic
Association football clubs established in 1920
Břeclav District